Hopsten is a municipality in the district of Steinfurt, in North Rhine-Westphalia, Germany. It is situated approximately 15 km northeast of Rheine and 25 km southeast of Lingen.

People 
 Bernhard Otte (1883-1933), politician and trade union leader 
 Franz-Josef Kemper (born 1945), athlete

Gallery

References

Steinfurt (district)